The 81st Blow ( and also known as The Eighty-First Blow) is a 1974 Israeli documentary film directed by Haim Gouri. The film covers the oppression of Jews under the Nazis and features rare historical footage of concentration camps. It was nominated for an Academy Award for Best Documentary Feature. The title is derived from a comment by a witness at Adolf Eichmann's trial. According to his testimony, he was whipped 80 times by the Nazis, but was not believed by Israelis after the war; this final doubt of his own people was the "81st blow". The 81st Blow is the first film in the Israeli Holocaust Trilogy by Bergman, Ehrlich and Gouri. It was followed by The Last Sea (1984) and Flames in the Ashes (1985).

References

External links
"The 81st Blow" - The full film is available on VOD on the website for the Israel Film Archive - Jerusalem Cinematheque

1974 films
1974 documentary films
Israeli documentary films
Israeli black-and-white films
Yiddish-language films
Films directed by Haim Gouri
Documentary films about the Holocaust